Gothe may refer to:

Surnames

Amon Göth (1908–1946), Austrian Nazi commandant of Kraków-Płaszów concentration camp and executed war criminal
Bror Geijer Göthe (1892 – 1949) a Swedish artist, a painter and textile artist
 Dieter Göthe former East German slalom canoeist
 Erik Gustaf Göthe (1779 – 1838) a Swedish sculptor
 Florian Gothe (born 1962) a retired German football defender
 Jurgen Gothe (1944 - 2015) a Canadian radio host
 Odd Christian Gøthe (1919 - 2002) a Norwegian civil servant and politician
 Staffan Göthe (born 1944) a Swedish playwright, actor and director

Places
 Gothe, a village in Karnataka, India.

See also
 Goethe (surname)
 Goth (disambiguation)
 Gotha 
 Goda (disambiguation)